The 1946 Giro di Lombardia, the 40th edition of the race, was held on 27 October 1946 on a total route of 231 km. It was won for the first time, of the 4 consecutive, by Italian Fausto Coppi, reached the finish line with the time of 6h24 ' 30 "at an average of 36.047 km/h, preceding the compatriots Luigi Casola and Michele Motta.

129 cyclists took off from Milan and 53 of them completed the race.

General classification

References

Giro di Lombardia
1946 in road cycling
1946 in Italian sport